In Western countries extended breastfeeding  usually means breastfeeding after the age of 12 to 24 months, depending on the culture.

Health benefits and Psychological effects

Health benefits 
Longitudinal research shows breastfed toddlers aged over 12 months have fewer illnesses and lower mortality rates. Milk composition in the second year of breastfeeding contains significantly higher concentrations of lactoferrin, lysozyme, and Immunoglobulin. These have been shown to support the child's immune system's antibodies.

 The World Health Organization recommends breastfeeding “up to two years of age or beyond”. 
 The American Academy of Family Physicians (AAFP) states that "[h]ealth outcomes for mothers and babies are best when breastfeeding continues for at least two years.
 The American Academy of Pediatrics (AAP) recommends "continuation of breastfeeding for 1 year or longer as mutually desired by mother and infant".

Psychological effects 

In A Time to Wean, Katherine Dettwyler states that "Western, industrialized societies can compensate for some (but not all) of the immunological benefits of breastfeeding with antibiotics, vaccines and improved sanitation. But the physical, cognitive, and emotional needs of the young child persist." Many children who are breast-fed into their toddler years use the milk as a comforting, bonding moment with their mothers. In a 1974 survey of 152 mothers, 17% said that the security their toddlers obtained through extended breastfeeding helped them become more independent, 14% said that extended breastfeeding created a strong mother-child bond, and 14.6% said that extended breastfeeding strengthened their abilities as a mother. Four mothers said that they felt their child was too dependent and one mother considered her child a poor eater. Dr. Stein said "A mother in my practice who breastfed 2 children until 2 years of age explained that she would slow down and give her undivided attention to her child several times each day when breastfeeding. Her children knew that she always had time for those moments each day. This time was also important to the mother for relaxing and unwinding.... For many nursing toddlers, the breast comes to serve the same function as a favorite blanket or stuffed animal in providing comfort and a sense of security." One issue with extended breastfeeding is the ability of the mother and the child to separate. Some say that the desire for extended breastfeeding comes from the mother's inability to let go of "her baby". Baldwin counters that the child is the one who chooses when they are weaned, as it is very difficult to force a child to breastfeed.

Practice by country or region

North America 

Elizabeth Baldwin says in Extended Breastfeeding and the Law, "Because our culture tends to view the breast as sexual, it can be hard for people to realize that breastfeeding is the natural way to nurture children." In Western countries such as the United States, Canada and the United Kingdom, extended breastfeeding is a taboo act. It is difficult to obtain accurate information and statistics about extended breastfeeding in these countries because of the mother's embarrassment. Mothers who nurse longer than the social norm sometimes hide their practices from all but very close family members and friends. This is called "closet nursing".

In the United States, breastfeeding beyond 1 year is considered extended breastfeeding, and in contrast to WHO recommendations which recommend exclusive breastfeeding until six months, and "continued breastfeeding up to 2 years of age or beyond" [with the addition of complimentary foods], the American Academy of Pediatrics stated in 1997 that, "Breastfeeding should be continued for at least the first year of life and beyond for as long as mutually desired by mother and child".

In the United States overall, according to a 2010 CDC "report card", 43% of babies are breastfed until 6 months and 22.4% are breastfed until 12 months, though breastfeeding rates varied among the states.

Breastfeeding rates in the U.S. at 6 months rose from 34.2% in 2000 to 43.5% in 2006 and the rates at 12 months rose from 15.7% in 2000 to 22.7% in 2006. The U.S. Healthy People 2010 goals were to have at least 60% of babies exclusively breastfed at 3 months and 25% of babies exclusively breastfed at 6 months so this goal has yet to be met.

There have been several cases in the United States where children have been taken away from their mother's care because the courts or government agencies found the mother's extended breastfeeding to be inappropriate.
In 1992, a New York mother lost custody of her child for a year. She was still breastfeeding the child at age 3 and had reported experiences of sexual arousal while breastfeeding the child. The authorities took the child from the home in the fear that the mother might sexually abuse the child. Later, the social service agency that took over the case said that there was more to the case than could be released to the press due to confidentiality laws. In 2000, an Illinois child was removed from the mother's care after a judge ruled that the child might suffer emotional damage as a result of not being weaned. The child was later returned to the mother and the judge vacated the finding of neglect. A social service agency in Colorado removed a 5-year-old child from the mother because she was still breastfeeding, but the court ordered the child returned to its family immediately.

Africa

Guinea-Bissau
In Guinea-Bissau, the average length of breastfeeding is 22.6 months.

Asia and Oceania

India

In India, mothers commonly breastfed their children until 2 to 3 years of age. Cows milk is given in combination with breast milk though use of formula has been on the rise.

As of November 2012, the Ministry of Women and Child Development, with UNICEF as a technical partner, have kicked off a nationwide campaign to promote exclusive breastfeeding to infants up to the age of six months - one among a series of advisories it is issuing - as part of an awareness program targeted at eradicating malnutrition in the country. Indian actor Aamir Khan serves as the brand ambassador, and has acted in numerous televised public service announcements.

Philippines

In the Philippines, the Implementing Rules and Regulations of the Milk Code require that breastfeeding be encouraged for babies up to the age of 2 years old or beyond. Under the same code, it is illegal to advertise infant formula or breastmilk substitutes intended for children 24 months old and below. However, a 2008 WHO survey found that on average, mothers in the Philippines breastfed their babies until 14 months of age, with breastfeeding lasting up to 17 months on average in rural areas. Almost 58% of mothers surveyed around the nation were still breastfeeding their babies when the babies were a year old, and 34.2% of mothers were still breastfeeding when their babies were 2 years old.

In 2012, it was reported that legislation had been introduced which would narrow down the application of the Milk Code (reducing the period recommending against artificial baby foods for babies from 0 to 36 months to 0 to six months only), would lift the restriction on donations of artificial milk products in emergency situations (encouraging mothers with disabilities to shift to milk substitutes instead of encouraging them to continue breastfeeding assisted by support persons), would change the legally mandated lactation break period for breastfeeding mothers from paid to unpaid status, and would remove the ban on milk companies giving away free samples of artificial milk products in the health care system.

In religion

Islam 
The central scripture of Islam, al-Quran, instructs that children be breastfed for two years from birth. Islam relies on the Islamic calendar, in which "year" refers to a lunar year of 12 lunar cycles, totaling 354 days in length, potentially with the addition of 1 day for a leap year.

References

Breastfeeding